Thomas Woodruff (born 1957) is a New York based artist who was born in New Rochelle, New York.  He received a BFA from Cooper Union in 1979. He taught at the School of Visual Arts in New York City for 39 years, and was Chair of the BFA Illustration and Cartooning Department for 20 years, stepping down as Chair Emeritus in 2021.

Much of the artist's output is in series.  Crying Clown, in the collection of the Honolulu Museum of Art, is from the Chromatic Aberration series.  It is an overly sentimentalized self-portrait painted in the early years of the AIDS epidemic, showing Woodruff’s feelings of anger and loss.  The Art Gallery of Western Australia, the Brooklyn Museum, the Greenville County Museum of Art (Greenville, South Carolina), the Honolulu Museum of Art, the New Orleans Museum of Art are among the public collections holding work by Thomas Woodruff.

References
 Woodruff, Thomas, Thomas Woodruff's Freak Parade, Hardy-Marks, 2006 ASIN: B01JO27RQY
 Woodruff, Thomas, Christopher Scoates, Debra Wilbur, Bill Arning, Christopher Sweet and Nick Debs, Nosegays and Knuckle Sandwiches, Work by Thomas Woodruff, Atlanta College of Art Gallery and City Gallery at Chastain, Atlanta, 1997

Footnotes

1957 births
Living people
American artists